Saleem Kausar, born Muhammad Saleem is a Pakistani Urdu poet. He has published several poetry books. He has also written various title songs for different TV play serials. He has attended several poetry gatherings in various countries.

Personal life
Kausar was born on 24 October 1947 in Panipat, India. After partition, his family migrated to Pakistan and settled  in Khanewal, Punjab, Pakistan. He received his primary and secondary education there. Later he moved to Kabeerwala with his family. In 1972, he shifted to Karachi, Sindh, where he has worked in various newspapers before joining Pakistan Television (PTV). He retired several years ago.

Literary career
Kausar began his literary career from Kabeerwala, where he met with well-known and national poets and learnt and practiced Urdu poetry. He also attended poetry gatherings. After moving to Karachi, he joined Urdu newspapers and wrote Qat'aas (quatrains), a form of  Urdu poetry on a daily basis. He has written five collections of Urdu poetry. He became famous after his ghazal  "Main khiyal hoon kisi aur ka" sung by various singers,  was breakthrough in 1980. He has visited several countries to participate the poetry gatherings, including Doha, United States, United Kingdom, Canada, Denmark, Middle East and India.

A writer says;

Awards
Received Pride of Performance Award from Governor of Sindh, Ishratul Ibad on 23 March 2015.

Bibliography
 Muhabbat aik shajar ha 1994 محبت اِک شجر ہے
 Khali haathon mein arz-o-sama 1980خالی ہاتھوں میں ارض و سماء
  Yeh chiragh hai tau jala rahai 1987یہ چراغ ہے تو جلا رہے
 Zara mausam badalnay dau 1991ذرا موسم بدلنے دو
 Duniya meri aarzoo se kam hey 2007 ''دنیا مری آرزو سے کم ہے'

جنہیں راستے میں خبر ہوئی
'

See also

 List of Pakistani poets
 List of Urdu language poets

References

External links
 AMU Alumni Celebrate Sir Syed Day in New York, The Muslim Observer (US newspaper) ARCHIVED 
 Saleem Kausar ghazals 

Living people
Pakistani poets
People from Khanewal District
People from Panipat
Punjabi people
Writers from Karachi
Urdu-language poets from Pakistan
1947 births
Recipients of the Pride of Performance